Penclawdd railway station served the village of Penclawdd, in the historic county of Glamorgan, Wales, from 1867 to 1931 on the Llanmorlais branch.

History
The station was opened on 14 December 1867 by the London and North Western Railway, although orders were given to open the station on 10 December of the same year. Trains originally ran on Wednesdays and Saturdays. In April 1868, the service was cut back to Saturdays only but the full service resumed in August 1871. The station closed on 5 January 1931.

References

Disused railway stations in Swansea
Railway stations in Great Britain opened in 1867
Railway stations in Great Britain closed in 1931
1867 establishments in Wales
1931 disestablishments in Wales